Zhashkiv Raion was a raion (district) of Cherkasy Oblast, central Ukraine. Its administrative centre was located at the town of Zhashkiv. The raion was abolished on 18 July 2020 as part of the administrative reform of Ukraine, which reduced the number of raions of Cherkasy Oblast to four. The area of Zhashkiv Raion was merged into Uman Raion. The last estimate of the raion population was 

At the time of disestablishment, the raion consisted of three hromadas:
 Bashtechky rural hromada with the administration in the selo of Bashtechky;
 Sokolivka rural hromada with the administration in the selo of Sokolivka;
 Zhashkiv urban hromada with the administration in Zhashkiv.

References

Former raions of Cherkasy Oblast
1923 establishments in Ukraine
Ukrainian raions abolished during the 2020 administrative reform